Francisco (Francesco) Leonardoni (1654–1711) was an Italian painter of the Baroque period, active mainly in Spain.

He was born in Venice, where he studied but was forced to leave the republic and travelled through various parts of Europe, till he settled at Madrid in 1680. There he distinguished himself by his portrait miniatures, although he also painted several pictures for the churches. In June 1694, after the death of Claudio Coello, he became the painter for Queen Mariana of Neuburg. For the church of the Convent of Atocha at Madrid he painted a Marriage and Death of St. Joseph and in the church of San Gerónimo el Real, a large altar-piece of the Annunciation. He  also restored the Transfiguration, a large altar at the Salvador church in Leganés which was completed in 1702. He died in Madrid.

References

Ceán Bermúdez, Juan Agustín (1800). Diccionario histórico de los más ilustres profesores de la Bellas Artes en España. Madrid, p. 19-20.
Palomino, Antonio, An account of the lives and works of the most eminent Spanish painters, sculptors and architects, 1724, first English translation, 1739, p. 169
Palomino, Antonio (1988). El museo pictórico y escala óptica III. El parnaso español pintoresco laureado. Madrid, Aguilar S.A. de Ediciones, p. 555-6. .
Pérez Sánchez, Alfonso E. (1992). Baroque Paintings in Spain, 1600-1750 Madrid, Cátedra, p. 346. .
Urrea Fernández, Jesús, "Pintura italiana en la corte de España durante la primera mitad del siglo XVIII" ("Italian paintings in the Spanish Court during the First Part of the 18th Century"), VV. AA., El arte del siglo de las luces, Barcelona, Galaxia Gutenberg, p. 116, 2010,

External links

Francisco (Francesco) Leonardoni at the Museo del Prado Online Encyclopedia 

1654 births
1711 deaths
17th-century Spanish painters
Spanish male painters
18th-century Spanish painters
18th-century Spanish male artists
17th-century Italian painters
Italian male painters
18th-century Italian painters
Italian Baroque painters
Painters from Venice
Portrait miniaturists
18th-century Italian male artists